Cooper's Sawmill is a California Historical Landmark located almost two miles north of Forestville, California, and is located in the jurisdiction of Santa Rosa, in the United States. It was the site of the first power-operated sawmill used for commercial purposes in California.

History

Cooper's Sawmill was built in 1834 by John B. R. Cooper. It was located on Rancho El Molino. Cooper built the mill approximately two years before he received a grant to Rancho El Molino. It became the first water power-operated sawmill used for commercial purposes in the state of California. Redwood lumber was the primary wood used at the sawmill. Its power came from Mark West Creek. In early 1841, the sawmill was destroyed by a flood.

California Historical Landmark

On November 3, 1969, Cooper's Sawmill was designated a California Historical Landmark.

References

California Historical Landmarks
History of Santa Rosa, California
Buildings and structures in Santa Rosa, California
Sawmills in the United States
1834 establishments in Alta California